JPMC may refer to:

Jerudong Park Medical Centre, Bruneian private specialist hospital
Jinnah Postgraduate Medical Centre, hospital in Karachi, Pakistan
Jordan Phosphate Mines, Jordanese mining company
JPMorgan Chase, American banking corporation